The 1995 State of Origin series was the 14th annual three-game series between the Queensland and New South Wales representative rugby league teams. Due to the Australian Rugby League's ongoing conflicts with Super League, they ruled that no Super League-aligned players were eligible for State of Origin selection in 1995.  This appeared to hurt Queensland, eliminating their mostly Brisbane Broncos back line, and they were not widely expected to win the series. However, they won 3–0, their first series win since 1991. Novice Queensland coach Paul Vautin made only one player change to his squad during the three game series.
This series once again saw State of Origin football venture to Melbourne, after an enthusiastic Melbourne crowd packed the MCG to watch game two of the 1994 series. Although the crowd in Melbourne was not as high as 1994's then-record origin crowd of 87,161, it was still a success, attracting 52,994 spectators and furthering the case for a first grade team in Melbourne.

Brisbane Broncos coach Wayne Bennett had originally been appointed as Queensland coach for 1995 taking over from Wally Lewis. He stepped down from the job, stating that Queensland would be uncompetitive without its Super League players. Paul Vautin, who had played 22 Origin games for Queensland between 1982 and 1990 (including two games as captain in the absence of Lewis), was brought in to replace him.


Game I
Unable to draw on the vast talents of the Brisbane Broncos whose Super League-aligned players were made ineligible for the Origin series by the Australian Rugby League, the Maroons selectors were forced to choose from a limited selection of Queenslanders from ARL-loyal clubs. Consequently, going into Game 1 at the Sydney Football Stadium, the Blues were unbackable favourites with nine internationals in the squad compared to Queensland's two in Dale Shearer and Papua New Guinea halfback Adrian Lam who had to be given dispensation to play for Qld, and an untested commentator-turned-coach in Paul Vautin. Although many considered NSW favourites, the starting sides in Game 1 actually saw Qld have 79 collective Origin games experience, while NSW had only 68 between them.

After the first ever try-less State of Origin match, the Maroons left the ground having produced one of the biggest boilovers in rugby league history. A sole penalty goal to Maroons hooker Wayne Bartrim after 30 minutes was enough to see Vautin's unfancied Queensland team home 2–0. Referee Eddie Ward penalised Blues front rower Paul Harragon for a tackle on Gary Larson and Bartrim kicked the goal from 25 metres out. At the time it seemed a minor event but by game's end the goal had become pivotal.

New South Wales failed to capitalise on their chances, crossing the Queensland line twice. First winger Rod Wishart stepped into touch after taking a cross-field kick from Andrew Johns. Then in the second half, Blues centre Terry Hill was held up by Queensland debutante winger Matt Sing over the line with 17 minutes to play. It was the lowest ever score in a representative game in Australia, yet still a compelling spectacle as the underdog Maroons repelled the New South Wales attack time and time again.

From this match came a moment for the annals of Origin tradition when broadcast sound and vision captured the indelible image of Maroons lock Billy Moore exiting the Sydney Football Stadium tunnel after half-time chanting the Maroon's war cry "Queenslander" over and over to exhort his team-mates.

Game II

Going into the second game, Qld suffered a blow when Dale Shearer, their most experienced player (having played 25 games since making his Origin debut in 1985) and only Australian test representative, was ruled out with injury. His place in the side was taken by 1994 Kangaroo tourist Jason Smith. Smith, who had initially signed with Super League earlier in the year, had turned his back on the rebels and had only recently re-signed with the ARL.

Rumours of an all-in brawl that had circulated before Game II at the Melbourne Cricket Ground were realised early when the first scrum erupted into violence after NSW  Jim Serdaris started throwing punches at his opposite Wayne Bartrim. Almost like it was rehearsed, most players from both sides became involved and it took referee Eddie Ward a considerable time to restore order (in the confusion, Ward also failed to stop the game clock and almost 5 minutes elapsed before time was called off). During the brawl there were two main groups. Rival back rowers David Barnhill and Billy Moore waged their own private war throwing a lot of punches that missed their mark before wrestling each other to the ground, while Origin's old cry of "Mate against mate" added another chapter when Manly-Warringah teammates John Hopoate (NSW) and Danny Moore (Qld) squared off after Moore came to Matt Sing's aid. Another outbreak late in the half saw props Paul Harragon and Gavin Allen marched to the sin bin.

Queensland had the run of play and again shocked their highly fancied rivals by racing to an 8–0 lead on the back of a Mark Coyne try and two goals from Wayne Bartrim. Blues captain Brad Fittler worked hard to lift his troops but again he found his team out enthused by Paul Vautin's patched-together but spirited combination.

With five minutes remaining, Jim Serdaris scored a converted try to close the gap to 14-12 and the Blues began a final wave of attack. Steve Menzies then came within inches of scoring the match winner but was held up, and then Fittler threw what appeared to be the match winning pass to a try-bound Tim Brasher. However referee Ward ruled the pass forward. As they dropped their guard, flying Queensland winger Brett Dallas caught them out in the dying seconds and ran 90 metres from dummy-half, easily out pacing Hopoate, Brasher and Rod Wishart coming across in cover, to score under the posts and seal the series with a 20–12 victory to give Qld what many believe to be the biggest boilover in Origin history.

Game III

Experts were still favouring a New South Wales win in game III, but again they were proved wrong in a match that lived up to Origin expectations. Manly captain Geoff Toovey was called into the NSW side after injury kept him out of the first two games of the series. The chances of popular Maroons' captain Trevor Gillmeister playing in the final game had looked impossible - he had been admitted to hospital with an infected knee and placed on an intravenous drip. In an inspiring gesture that underlined the ferocity of feeling in the side signed himself out to take his place in the team.

The two combatants punched and counter-punched before a late try to the previously unheralded Gold Coast rookie Ben Ikin gave the Maroons a 24–16 win and a 3–0 series whitewash. New South Wales led twice at 10-6 after 35 minutes and again 16-12 after 41 minutes, but the Queensland spirit was resolute. The series was career defining for Ikin, a Gold Coast junior who became the youngest player in Origin history at 18 years and 83 days when he debuted in Game I. He would later become a mainstay of Queensland and Broncos' sides up until 2003 although his career was disrupted by injury.

Many considered Queensland lucky to play the last 52 minutes of the match with a full team after prop forward Tony Hearn appeared to headbutt NSW prop Mark Carroll in the 28th minute. In retaliation Carroll started throwing punches at Hearn which led to another all in brawl. Remarkably, referee David Manson only put Hearn on report and then penalised Carroll for the use of a forearm while tackling Hearn and awarded a penalty to Qld. Hearn was later suspended for 8 games by the ARL judiciary as a result of his headbutt. After his performances for Qld in the first two games, the front row forward from North Sydney had allegedly been in line for an Australian test jumper before his suspension.

After the game, Gillmeister returned to hospital to continue treatment on his knee.

New South Wales teams

Queensland teams

See also
 1995 ARL season
 1995 Trans-Tasman Test series
 Super League War

References

Sources
 Big League's 25 Years of Origin Collectors' Edition, News Magazines, Surry Hills, Sydney
 Chesterton, Ray (1996) Good as Gould, Ironbark, Sydney

External links
 1995 State of Origin at sportsphotography.net

State of Origin series
State of Origin series